Seyyed Davud (also Romanized as Seyyed Dāvūd) is a village in Ahudasht Rural District, Shavur District, Shush County, Khuzestan Province, Iran. At the 2006 census, its population was 166, in 28 families.

References 

Populated places in Shush County